The 2014 Individual Speedway Australian Championship was a Motorcycle speedway competition organised by Motorcycling Australia for the Australian Solo Championship.

The three final rounds took place between 4 January and 11 January. The championship was won by 2012 World Champion Chris Holder who won his 5th Australian title. Jason Doyle finished in second place with Josh Grajczonek in third.

The rounds were held at the Loxford Park Speedway 4 January, Undera Park Speedway on 8 January, with the final round held at Adelaide's Gillman Speedway on 11 January.

Qualification
 Qualification
 3 January
  Kurri Kurri, New South Wales - Loxford Park Speedway
 Referee: 
 Qualification: the top 9 riders to the Australian Championship

Finals
Eight riders were seeded through to the finals:
 Troy Batchelor
 Jason Doyle
 Josh Grajczonek
 Chris Holder
 Jack Holder
 Dakota North
 Rohan Tungate
 Cameron Woodward

Loxford Park
 Round one
 3 January
  Kurri Kurri, New South Wales - Loxford Park Speedway
 Referee: 
 Top 3 riders to "A" Final, riders 4-7 to "B" Final
 "B" Final winner to "A" Final

Loxford Park "B" Final
1 - Chris Holder
2 - Josh Grajczonek
3 - Jack Holder
4 - Sam Masters

Loxford Park "A" Final
1 - Jason Doyle
2 - Chris Holder
3 - Cameron Woodward
4 - Troy Batchelor

Undera Park
 Round two
 8 January
  Undera, Victoria - Undera Park Speedway
 Referee:  
 Top 3 riders to "A" Final, riders 4-7 to "B" Final
 "B" Final winner to "A" Final

Undera Park "B" Final
1 - Chris Holder
2 - Dakota North
3 - Josh Grajczonek
4 - Rohan Tungate

Undera Park "A" Final
1 - Chris Holder
2 - Jason Doyle
3 - Justin Sedgmen
4 - Troy Batchelor (fx)

Gillman
 Round three
 11 January
  Gillman, South Australia - Gillman Speedway
 Referee:  
 Top 3 riders to "A" Final, riders 4-7 to "B" Final
 "B" Final winner to "A" Final

Gillman "B" Final
1 - Mason Campton
2 - Josh Grajczonek
3 - Justin Sedgmen
4 - Max Fricke

Gillman "A" Final
1 - Rohan Tungate
2 - Chris Holder
3 - Mason Campton
4 - Jason Doyle (fx)

Intermediate Classification

References

See also
 Australian Individual Speedway Championship
 Australia national speedway team
 Sports in Australia

Australia
Speedway in Australia